The women's discus throw at the 2015 World Championships in Athletics was held at the Beijing National Stadium on 24 and 25 August.

In 2015, Denia Caballero found five extra metres in her throws to become the number one ranked thrower.  She had no intention of making a dramatic competition.  On her first throw, the sixth throw of qualifying she launched the best throw of the preliminary round.  Then in the finals, on her first effort only four throws into the competition she threw 69.28.  Only one other girl in Beijing had ever thrown a discus that far, she was the defending champion Sandra Perković.  So it was up to the rest of the field to do something spectacular or settle for other medals.  Three throws later Nadine Müller threw 65.53 to take over second place.  After fouling her first attempt, Perković threw 65.35 to move into third place.  Gia Lewis-Smallwood was the only other athlete to reach the low 69's was not having a 69 kind of day, instead muddled at the back of the field.  On her final throw Perković threw 67.39 to finally move into silver medal position.  Yaime Pérez tried to make it interesting but her 65.46 final attempt missed a medal.

Records
Prior to the competition, the records were as follows:

Qualification standards

Schedule

Results

Qualification
Qualification: 63.00 m (Q) or at least 12 best performers (q).

Final
The final was started at 19:00.

References

Discus throw
Discus throw at the World Athletics Championships
2015 in women's athletics